The Dwight H. Terry Lectureship, also known as the Terry Lectures, was established at Yale University in 1905 by a gift from Dwight H. Terry of Bridgeport, Connecticut. Its purpose is to engage both scholars and the public in a consideration of religion from a humanitarian point of view, in the light of modern science and philosophy.  The subject matter has historically been similar to that of the Gifford Lectures in Scotland, and several lecturers have participated in both series.

Establishment of the Lectureship
The 1905 deed of gift establishing the lectureship states:

Although commitment to the gift was made in 1905 it did not mature until 1923, which is when the first Terry lectures were held.

Lecture format
The lectures are free and open to the public.  A single installment generally consists of four lectures by the same visiting scholar, given over the course of a month or less.  Many of the lectures have been edited into books published by the Yale University Press, and remain in print to this day (see below). From 1999 to 2009 the lectures were recorded and posted on the Terry Lectures website as audio and/or video streams. Starting in 2008, recordings of the lectures have been made available via Yale's YouTube channel and a Terry Lectures playlist.

Past Terry Lectureships
2019 Karen Barad
2018 Thomas E. Lovejoy The World of the Born and the World of the Made: A New Vision of Our Emerald Planet
2017 Judith Farquhar Reality, Reason, and Action In and Beyond Chinese Medicine
2016-17 Kwame Anthony Appiah The Anatomy of Religion
2015 Janet Browne Becoming Darwin: History, Memory, and Biography
2014 Wendy Doniger The Manipulation of Religion by the Sciences of Politics and Pleasure in Ancient India
2013 Philip Kitcher Secular Humanism
2012 Keith Stewart Thomson Jefferson and Darwin: Science and Religion in Troubled Times
2010 Joel Primack and Nancy Ellen Abrams Cosmic Society: The New Universe and the Human Future : 
2009 Marilynne Robinson Absence of Mind: The Dispelling of Inwardness from the Modern Myth of the Self : 
2008 Donald S. Lopez, Jr. The Scientific Buddha: Past, Present, Future : 
2008 Terry Eagleton Faith and Fundamentalism: Is Belief in Richard Dawkins Necessary for Salvation? : 
2007 Ahmad Dallal Islam, Science, and the Challenge of History : 
2006 Barbara Herrnstein Smith Natural Reflections: Human Cognition at the Nexus of Science and Religion " 
2006 (Centennial Conference) Robert Wuthnow No Contradictions Here:  Science, Religion, and the Culture of All Reasonable Possibilities
2006 (Centennial Conference) Lawrence M. Krauss Religion vs. Science?  From the White House to Classroom
2006 (Centennial Conference) Alvin Plantinga Science and Religion:  Why Does the Debate Continue?
2006 (Centennial Conference) Kenneth R. Miller Darwin, God, and Dover:  What the Collapse of 'Intelligent Design' Means for Science and for Faith in America
2006 (Centennial Conference) Ronald L. Numbers Aggressors, Victims, and Peacemakers:  Historical Actors in the Drama of Science and Religion
2004 David Sloan Wilson Evolution for Everyone
2003 Mary Douglas Writing in Circles: Ring Composition as a Creative Stimulus: 
2003 H.C. Erik Midelfort Exorcism and Enlightenment: Johann Joseph Gassner and the Demons of 18th-Century Germany: 
2001 Francisco J. Ayala From Biology to Ethics: An Evolutionist's View of Human Nature
2000 Peter Singer One World: The Ethics and Politics of Globalization: 
1999 Bas C. Van Fraassen The Empirical Stance: 
1998 David Hartman Struggling for the Soul of Israel: A Jewish Response to History: 
1996–1997  Rev. John Polkinghorne Belief in God in an Age of Science: 
1993–1994  Walter J. Gehring Genetic Control of Development: 
1988–1989  Joshua Lederberg Science and Modern Life
1986–1987  Eric R. Kandel Cell and Molecular Biological Explorations of Learning and Memory
1985–1986  Stephen Jay Gould Darwin and Dr. Doolittle: ‘Just History’ as the Wellspring of Nature’s Order
1979–1980  Hans Jonas Technology and Ethics: The Imperative of Responsibility: 
1978–1979  Adin Steinsaltz
1977–1978  Hans Küng Freud and the Problem of God: 
1976–1977  Philip Rieff
1975–1976  David Baken And They Took Themselves Wives: Male Female Relations in the Bible
1973–1974  Father Theodore M. Hesburgh  The Humane Imperative: A Challenge for the Year 2000: 
1971–1972  James Hillman Re-Visioning Psychology: 
1968–1969  Albert J. Reiss Jr. Civility and the Moral Order: The Police and the Public: 
1967–1968  Clifford Geertz In Search of Islam: Religious Change in Indonesia / Islam Observed: Religious Development in Morocco and Indonesia: 
1966–1967  Loren Eiseley
1964–1965  James Munro Cameron Images of Authority: A Consideration of the Concept of Regnum and Sacerdotium: 
1963–1964  Walter J. Ong  The Presence of the Word: Some Prolegomena for Cultural and Religious History: 
1962–1963  Michael Polanyi Man and Thought: A Symbiosis / The Tacit Dimension: 
1961–1962  Norbert Wiener Prolegomena to Theology
1961–1962  Paul Ricoeur The Philosopher Before Symbols (published as Freud and Philosophy: An Essay on Interpretation)
1958–1959  Hermann Dörries Constantine and Religious Liberty: 
1957–1958  Margaret Mead Continuities in Cultural Evolution: 
1956–1957  Errol Eustace Harris The Idea of God in Modern Thought / Revelation Through Reason: Religion in the Light of Science and Philosophy: 
1955–1956  Rebecca West The Court and the Castle: Some Treatments of a Recurrent Theme
1954–1955  Pieter Geyl Use and Abuse of History: 
1953–1954  Gordon Willard Allport Becoming: Basic Considerations for a Psychology of Personality: 
1951–1952  Jerome Clarke Hunsaker Aeronautics at the Mid-Century: 
1950–1951  Paul Johannes Tillich The Courage to Be: 
1949–1950  Erich Fromm Psychoanalysis and Religion: 
1948–1949  George Gaylord Simpson The Meaning of Evolution: 
1947–1948  Alexander Stewart Ferguson
1946–1947  Charles Hartshorne The Divine Relativity: A Social Conception of God: 
1946–1947  Henri Frankfort
1945–1946  James Bryant Conant On Understanding Science: 
1944–1945  Julius Seelye Bixler Conversations with an Unrepentant Liberal: 
1943–1944  George Washington Corner Ourselves Unborn: An Embryologist's Essay on Man: 
1942–1943  Jacques Maritain Education at the Crossroads: 
1942–1943  Alexander Dunlop Lindsay Religion, Science, and Society in the Modern World: 
1941–1942  Reinhold Niebuhr
1940–1941  Alan Gregg The Furtherance of Medical Research
1939–1940  Henry Ernest Sigerist Medicine and Human Welfare: 
1938–1939  Te Rangi Hīroa Anthropology and Religion: 
1937–1938  Carl Gustav Jung Psychology and Religion: 
1936–1937  Joseph Barcroft The Brain and Its Environment
1935–1936  John Macmurray The Structure of Religious Experience: 
1934–1935  Joseph Needham Order and Life: 
1933–1934  John Dewey A Common Faith: 
1932–1933  Herbert Spencer Jennings The Universe and Life: 
1931–1932  Arthur Holly Compton The Freedom of Man: 
1930–1931  Hermann Weyl The Open World: 
1929–1930  William Pepperell Montague Belief Unbound: A Promethean Religion for the Modern World: 
1928–1929  James Young Simpson Nature: Cosmic, Human, and Divine: 
1927–1928  William Brown Science and Personality: 
1926–1927  Robert Andrews Millikan Evolution in Science and Religion: 
1925–1926  William Ernest Hocking The Self: Its Body and Freedom: 
1924–1925  Henry Norris Russell Fate and Freedom: 
1923–1924  John Arthur Thomson Concerning Evolution:

References

Philosophy events
Philosophy of religion
Terry
Lectures on religion and science